Encyclia bohnkiana  is a species of orchid endemic in the Atlantic rain forest to the northeast of Brazil.

Gallery

References

External links 
 
 

bohnkiana